Hendrik Odendaal (born 9 October 1979) is a South African swimmer.

Career
Odendaal competed for South Africa at the 2002 Commonwealth Games in Manchester where he finished 11th in semi-finals of the 100 metre butterfly in 55.32, 15th in semi-finals of the 50 metre butterfly in 25.08 and with Roland Schoeman, Lyndon Ferns and Ryk Neethling won silver in the 4 × 100 metre freestyle relay in 3:18.86.

See also
 List of Commonwealth Games medallists in swimming (men)

References

1979 births
Living people
South African male swimmers
South African male freestyle swimmers
Male butterfly swimmers
Commonwealth Games silver medallists for South Africa
Swimmers at the 2002 Commonwealth Games
Commonwealth Games medallists in swimming
Place of birth missing (living people)
20th-century South African people
21st-century South African people
Medallists at the 2002 Commonwealth Games